The 2000 Baku earthquake occurred on November 25 at 22:09 (18:09 UTC) local time with an epicenter just offshore Baku, Azerbaijan. It measured 6.8 on the moment magnitude scale and the maximum felt intensity was VI on the Mercalli intensity scale. It was followed three minutes later by a quake measuring 5.9. It was the strongest for almost 160 years, since 1842 in the Baku suburbs and in addition to the capital affected Sumgayit, Shamakhi and neighboring cities. According to the United States Geological Survey, the epicentre was in the Caspian Sea, 25 km to the south-southeast of Baku. The earthquake was felt as far away as e.g. Tbilisi, 600 km northwest of the epicentre, Makhachkala and the Karabudakh and Isberbas settlements in Dagestan.

Tectonic setting
Baku lies on the Absheron peninsula close to the northern edge of the broad and complex zone of deformation caused by the continuing collision between the Arabian Plate and the Eurasian Plate. There are two main active seismic zones on the Absheron peninsula. The northern zone is part of the North Caucasus thrust belt that continues to the east along the Apsheron Sill, which is interpreted to be a zone of active subduction. Earthquakes recorded in the northern zone are mainly deep reverse or shallow normal in type. The southern zone is interpreted to be a continuation of the Greater Caucasus thrust. Earthquakes in this area are mainly reverse or right lateral strike-slip in type.

Earthquake
The earthquake consisted of two closely spaced events 90 seconds apart. The first event had an oblique reverse fault mechanism on a steeply-dipping fault trending northwest–-southeast, while the second was pure reverse in type on a moderately-dipping reverse fault trending west-northwest–east-southeast. Within the uncertainties, the two events occurred at the same depth, at about 40 km.

Damage

According to the Azerbaijani government, 26 people died as a primary result, but only three people in collapsing buildings. A total of 412 people were either hospitalised or sought medical assistance. President Heydar Aliyev announced that more than 90 buildings and apartment blocks have been seriously damaged. Damage was identified at the German church, the 15th century Shirvanshahs' Palace, the Opera and Ballet Theatre, the Taza Pir Mosque, the Blue Mosque and the Palace of Marriage Registrations. Despite affecting northeastern coastline of Azerbaijan no damage to the offshore oil exploration infrastructure has been reported.

Many phone lines were down and the electricity was out in much of the city. Due to anxiety caused by possible fires the natural gas supply was reduced to 80%. Baku and Sumgait residents spent the rest of the night on the street. After the disaster seismologists have banned the construction of buildings with over nine floors.

On the same day the earthquake in Saratov caused by tectonic changes in the Volga region after the Baku earthquake took place.

Aftermath
Following the presidential decree of November 28, 2000, the State Emergency Commission was provided with an amount of ca. US$5,5 million in order to deal with the consequences of the earthquake. The SEC dispatched assessment teams to the affected areas. In Baku, as of November 27, 19 families have been evacuated from three severely damaged houses. Schools have been temporarily closed.

The UN Disaster Management Team, composed of UNDP, UNHCR, UNICEF, UNFPA, and WHO, was established in order to consider opportunities to support the governmental efforts. The IFRC launched an emergency appeal for international assistance amounting to US$590,000.

See also
 List of earthquakes in 2000
 List of earthquakes in Azerbaijan

References

External links
 Massive earthquake rocks Caspian Sea port – CNN
 The only existing video footage of the earthquake
 Azerbaijan: Earthquake – International Federation of Red Cross and Red Crescent Societies
 

Baku earthquake
Baku earthquake, 2000
Articles containing video clips
History of Baku
Baku
Baku
2000 disasters in Azerbaijan
2000 disasters in Asia